Winston is a census-designated place (CDP) in Broadwater County, Montana, United States. The population was 147 at the 2010 census.

The post office opened in 1892.

Geography
Winston is located at  (46.476685, -111.658941). Montana Highway 287 runs through the town. Canyon Ferry Lake is to the east.

Climate
According to the Köppen Climate Classification system, Winston has a semi-arid climate, abbreviated "BSk" on climate maps.

Demographics

As of the census of 2000, there were 73 people, 27 households, and 18 families residing in the CDP. The population density was 21.8 people per square mile (8.4/km). There were 30 housing units at an average density of 8.9 per square mile (3.4/km). The racial makeup of the CDP was 95.89% White, 1.37% Native American, 1.37% Asian, and 1.37% from two or more races.

There were 27 households, out of which 40.7% had children under the age of 18 living with them, 51.9% were married couples living together, 11.1% had a female householder with no husband present, and 33.3% were non-families. 25.9% of all households were made up of individuals, and 14.8% had someone living alone who was 65 years of age or older. The average household size was 2.70 and the average family size was 3.44.

In the CDP, the population was spread out, with 30.1% under the age of 18, 5.5% from 18 to 24, 26.0% from 25 to 44, 27.4% from 45 to 64, and 11.0% who were 65 years of age or older. The median age was 35 years. For every 100 females, there were 82.5 males. For every 100 females age 18 and over, there were 82.1 males.

The median income for a household in the CDP was $14,500, and the median income for a family was $56,250. Males had a median income of $35,683 versus $28,750 for females. The per capita income for the CDP was $18,846. None of the population and none of the families were below the poverty line.

References

Census-designated places in Broadwater County, Montana
Census-designated places in Montana